The Cambodia–Thailand border is the international border between Cambodia and Thailand. The border is 817 km (508 mi) in length and runs from the tripoint with Laos in the north-east to the Gulf of Thailand in the south.

Description
The border starts in the north-east at the tripoint with Thailand at Preah Chambot peak in the Dângrêk Mountains and the follows the crest of the mountains westwards. Upon leaving the mountains the border turns south-westwards in a broad arc, occasionally utilising rivers such as the Svay Chek, the Sisophon, the Phrom Hot and Mongkol Borei. It then proceeds south, partly along the Cardamom Mountains, terminating at the Gulf of Thailand coast. This latter section runs very close to the Gulf, producing a long, thin strip of Thai territory.

History

The boundary area has historically switched back and forth between various Khmer and Thai empires. From the 1860s France began establishing a presence in the region, initially in modern Cambodia and Vietnam, and later Laos, with the colony of French Indochina being created in 1887. In 1867 a Franco-Thai treaty confirmed Thai ownership of the Battambang and Angkor (Nakhou Siemrap) regions. In 1896 Britain (based in Burma) and France agreed to leave Siam (the then name for Thailand) as a buffer state between their respective colonies. However France continued to expand at the expense of Siam, annexing northern Cambodia in 1904 and then Battambang, Sisophon and Siam Nakhon/Siem Reap in 1907, whilst ceding Trat to Siam. The modern Cambodian-Thai border was as such delimited through several treaties between France and Siam between 1867 and 1907. Following Japan's invasion of French Indochina in 1940 the areas ceded to France in 1904 and 1907 were returned to Thailand, however this was reversed following Japan's defeat and the pre-war border restored in 1946.Cambodia gained independence in 1953, and the two state since then have had a fractious relationship. A dispute arose in the late 1950s over the ownership of the Preah Vihear Temple, which lies adjacent to the border in the Dângrêk Mountains. In 1962 the case was referred to the International Court of Justice, which ruled in favour of Cambodia, however Thailand expressed reservations as to the outcome. The mid-1960s also saw a dispute over ownership of Ko Kut island.  These disputes faded as Cambodia became engulfed in a series of conflicts in the following decades and the disastrous rule of the Khmer Rouge, with thousands of refugees crossing the border. By 1981, over 250,000 Cambodian and Vietnamese refugees lived in twenty camps along the border, supported by international aid agencies and the United Nations Border Relief Operation. Sporadic fighting broke out along the border following Vietnam's invasion of Cambodia in 1979, continuing throughout the 1980s until Vietnam withdrew from the country in 1989. In an effort to stop Khmer Rouge infiltration from Thailand, Cambodia built a large fortified fence along the border in the second half of the 1980s. Since the advent of peace in Cambodia in the early 1990s relations with Thailand have once again soured over the Preah Vihear issue, as well as, to a lesser extent, Ko Kut island. A border commission was set up in 1995 in an attempt to settle the issues peacefully, however it has made little progress and a full border demarcation satisfactory to both sides remain outstanding.

Border crossings

As of 2019, there were 7 permanent border crossings, 1 temporary border crossing, 9 checkpoints for border trade and 1 checkpoint for tourism which is currently closed.

Permanent Border Crossing

Temporary Border Crossing 
Temporary border crossing for the construction of the Thai-Cambodia Friendship Bridge only, which will become a permanent border crossing in the future.

Checkpoint for Border Trade 
Border crossing open for cross-border local trade only. There are 9 checkpoints for border trade officially recognized by the Ministry of Interior, located in Ubon Ratchathani, Buriram, Sa Kaeo, Chanthaburi and Trat provinces. Entering the opposite country beyond these checkpoints and their associated markets is illegal.

Checkpoint for Tourism 
There is one checkpoint for tourism, which is currently closed since June 2008 due to the Preah Vihear dispute and eventual cession of Preah Vihear Temple to Cambodia.

See also
 Cambodia–Thailand relations
 Cambodian–Thai border dispute
 Cambodian humanitarian crisis
 Vietnamese border raids in Thailand
 Indochina refugee crisis
 Nong Chan Refugee Camp
 Nong Samet Refugee Camp
 Sa Kaeo Refugee Camp
 Site Two Refugee Camp
 Khao-I-Dang

References

 
border
Borders of Cambodia
Borders of Thailand
International borders